Mohammed Saleh Abdullah Al-Ghassani (born 1 April 1985), commonly known as Mohammed Al-Ghassani, is an Omani footballer who plays for the Oman Professional League club, Seeb.

Club career

On 31 August 2014, he signed a one-year contract with Al-Shabab Club. Later on, he returned to two of his formers clubs, Al-Musannah and Saham.

Club career statistics

International career
Mohammed was selected for the national team for the first time in 2007. He has made appearances in the 2007 AFC Asian Cup qualification, 2011 AFC Asian Cup qualification and the 2010 FIFA World Cup qualification and has represented the national team in the 2014 FIFA World Cup qualification.

International goals
Scores and results list Oman's goal tally first.

References

External links
 
 
 Mohammed Al-Ghassani at Goal.com
 
 

1985 births
Living people
Omani footballers
Oman international footballers
Association football forwards
2007 AFC Asian Cup players
Suwaiq Club players
Al-Nahda Club (Oman) players
Saham SC players
Al-Musannah SC players
Al-Shabab SC (Seeb) players
Oman Professional League players
2019 AFC Asian Cup players
People from Al Batinah North Governorate